Treehouse Records may refer to:

Treehouse Records, a Nashville-based record label established in 2009 by Morris Management Group’s Dale Morris, Clint Higham and Mike Betterton, through a partnership with Front Line Management CEO Irving Azoff. First major artist signed: Blaine Larsen.

Oar Folkjokeopus, a former Minneapolis. Minnesota record store which served as headquarters for 1980s-1990s indie record label "Treehouse Records"

Treehouse Records was a Minneapolis-based record label which was active from 1986-1990.  The label was a partnership between Mark Trehus, then manager of Oar Folkjokeopus, a record store in Minneapolis, and John Thompson, aka Johnny Dromette, who had a label called Drome Records that was active in Cleveland between 1977 and 1979.  Trehus and Thompson met in a drug treatment facility in Minneapolis in 1985, where both were being treated for chemical dependency. Upon completing treatment, Thompson moved from Cleveland to Minneapolis.

In 1986, Trehus became enamored with (and subsequently was asked to manage) a young group from Edina, Minnesota called Bad Trip.  Through Bad Trip guitarist Tom Herbers, the band recorded a single at a studio where Herbers was learning to become a recording engineer (he is now a renowned engineer, as well as Low’s touring sound man).  Trehus had his friend Thompson design the label and picture sleeve, another friend Sally Sweet design the logo, and Treehouse Records #001 was released.

In 1987, Treehouse Records released a retrospective LP compilation of material recorded by a Cleveland punk band that Thompson managed in the late 70s, the Pagans.  The album was entitled “Buried Alive,” and included material recorded between 1977 and 1979.  All but one of its seventeen songs were recorded with the financial support of Thompson, including 6 now-legendary single sides recorded for his Drome Records (also the name of Thompson’s record store of the era).  The LP went on to sell 4000 copies in this incarnation.

By this time, Trehus was managing Oar Folkjokeopus Records in Minneapolis, and John was pursuing a career as a graphic designer. The two continued to issue 12” and 7” records through 1990, when the label dissolved due to many circumstances, not least of which was Trehus’ professed inability to handle the stress of being a full-time record store manager as well as a full-time partner running a record label.  

Among the noteworthy releases on the label were first records by Minneapolis bands Cows, Babes In Toyland, and the Bastards, as well as legendary bluesmen Dave “Snaker” Ray and Tony “Little Sun” Glover.  Cows went on to a long tenure with Amphetamine Reptile Records, who also released records by Janitor Joe, a band headed by former Bastard Joe Breuer, which also included Oar Folkjokeopus employee Kristen Pfaff, who went on to play bass with Seattle-based band Hole.

After the dissolution of the Treehouse Records label, Thompson married.  He moved to Los Angeles in the 1990s, before relocating back to Cleveland with his wife and two daughters.  During this time, Thompson did much freelance artwork for publications such as Hustler, for Larry Flynt, and album covers for lifelong friend David Thomas, including iconic covers for Pere Ubu, David Thomas & the Pedestrians and Rocket From The Tombs.  Today, Thompson continues to do freelance work from his home in Cleveland.

Trehus managed Oar Folkjokeopus from 1986 through early 2001, at which time he took over the business and rechristened it Treehouse Records, in April 2001. He retired from record retail on New Years Eve 2017-2018. During the previous 27+ years, following the stint with Treehouse Records (the label), he whetted his desire to work with music he enjoyed by producing records for Minneapolis-based blues icons Dave Ray and Tony Glover (for Rough Trade and Tim/Kerr Records) and continuing his passion for record-collecting.  In 2005, he started a second hobby record label, Nero’s Neptune Records.  The focus of that label was to issue records by artists that Trehus had befriended over time, including Paul Metzger, Michael Yonkers, Pere Ubu, Charlie Parr, and one of his heroes, Spider John Koerner.  Although stagnant since 2015, Trehus has vowed that 2021 will see the return of his modest endeavor, with many new and interesting releases promised.  There are rumors of another Pagans project with old friend and partner John Thompson.